Hawaiï-sur-Rhône is a freestyle kayaking venue and natural standing wave on the River Rhône.

Reference 
Canoeing and kayaking venues
Sports venues in Lyon